Alfrēds is a masculine Latvian given name. Notable people with the name include:

Alfrēds Andersons (1879–1937), Latvian civil engineer, intellectual, pedagogue, educational worker and mayor
Alfrēds Hartmanis (1881–1927), Latvian chess player
Alfrēds Kalniņš (1879–1951), Latvian composer, organist, pedagogue, music critic and conductor
Alfrēds Kalniņš (1894–1960), Latvian racewalker
Alfrēds Krauklis (1911–1991), Latvian basketball player and coach
Alfrēds Rubiks (born 1935), Latvian politician
Alfrēds Verners, Latvian footballer and ice hockey player

Latvian masculine given names